Capoeta mandica is a species of ray-finned fish endemic to Iran.

References 

mandica
Endemic fauna of Iran
Fish described in 1982